Ana María Moix (12 April 1947 – 28 February 2014) was a Spanish poet, novelist, short story writer, translator and editor. A member of the Novísimos, she was the younger sister of the writer, Terenci Moix.

Moix was born in Barcelona and studied Philosophy at the University of Barcelona. Active in contemporary Spanish poetry, she gained notability by being the only woman included in 1968 by José María Castellet in the Novísimos. From 1969 to 1973, she published three books of poetry. Later, she stopped publishing fiction for more than ten years, except for the children's book Los robots. Her second book of short stories won the 1985 City of Barcelona Award, after which she published another novel and two collections of short stories. Moix translated dozens of books, mainly from French. From 1976 to 1979, she was part of the team that published the journal, Vindicación Feminista. Moix was able to employ textual strategies "in order to counter the silencing of lesbianism while still managing to evade the Francoist censor".

Moix was awarded the Creu de Sant Jordi in 2006. She died in Barcelona in 2014 at the age 66, a victim of cancer.

Selected works

Poetry 
Baladas del dulce Jim, 1969
Call me Stone, 1969
No time for flowers y otras historias, 1971
A imagen y semejanza, 1983

Prose 

Julia, 1970
Ese chico pelirrojo a quien veo cada día, 1971 
Walter ¿por qué te fuiste?, 1973 
La maravillosa colina de las edades primitivas, 1973 
Veinticuatro por veinticuatro, 1973 
Mara Girona: una pintura en libertad, 1977
Los robots. Las penas, 1982 
Las virtudes peligrosas, 1985
Miguelón, 1986
La niebla y otros relatos, 1988 
Vals negro, 1994
El baix Llobregat, 29 municipis i un riu. Barcelona, 1995
Extraviadas ilustres, 1996 
24 horas con la Gauche divine, 2002 
El querido rincón, 2002
De mi vida real nada sé, 2002

Essay 
 Manifiesto personal, 2011

References

1947 births
2014 deaths
University of Barcelona alumni
Writers from Barcelona
Women writers from Catalonia
Poets from Catalonia
Novelists from Catalonia
Short story writers from Catalonia
Translators from Catalonia
Spanish editors
Catalan-language writers
Spanish LGBT writers
Deaths from cancer in Spain
Spanish women editors
Spanish women novelists
Spanish women poets
Spanish women short story writers
20th-century Spanish poets
20th-century Spanish novelists
20th-century Spanish women writers
20th-century translators
20th-century short story writers
21st-century LGBT people